Coringa is a rural locality in the North Burnett Region, Queensland, Australia.

Geography 
The Burnett River forms the northern boundary of the locality. At the west of the locality is the Paradise Dam which creates Lake Paradise. The filling of the dam flooded most of the former town of Paradise.

History
The town of Paradise was established in 1889 as a gold mining township. It was on the Burnett River.  The town reserve was established on 20 July 1891. In 1898, the town was abandoned when the gold rush was over. At its peak, Paradise had a population of over 2,000 people.

Paradise Provisional School opened about 1892 and closed in 1904. In December 1905, tenders were called to relocate the school building to Mount Shamrock.

Coringa Provisional School opened on 3 November 1930. In 1936, it become Coringa State School. It closed on 21 June 1996. It is on Coringa Road.

Paradise Dam was completed in 2005, inundating the town of Paradise.

Heritage listings 
Coringa has a number of heritage-listed sites, including:
 Campbells Road: Paradise Cemetery

Education 
There are no schools in Coringa. The nearest government primary schools are Dallarnil State School in neighbouring Dallarnil to the east and Biggenden State School in Biggenden to the south-east. Biggenden State School also offers secondary schooling to Year 10. The nearest government secondary schools offering secondary schooling to Year 12 are Isis District State High School in Childers to the north-east and Burnett State College in Gayndah to the south-west.

References

External links 

 

North Burnett Region
Localities in Queensland